The Schildspitze is a mountain in the Ortler Alps in South Tyrol, Italy.

References 
 Alpenverein South Tyrol 

Mountains of the Alps
Mountains of South Tyrol
Alpine three-thousanders
Ortler Alps